Jacques and November is a 1984 Canadian drama film directed by Jean Beaudry and François Bouvier. The film was selected as the Canadian entry for the Best Foreign Language Film at the 58th Academy Awards, but was not accepted as a nominee.

The film stars Beaudry as Jacques Landry, a man in his early 30s who is dying of an unspecified incurable disease and documenting his thoughts on mortality in a video diary; simultaneously, his friend Denis (Pierre Rousseau) is trying to make a higher-budget documentary film about him.

Critics largely analyzed the film not as focusing on death as such, but as an affirming and uplifting look at the meaning that friends and family bring to life. Although Jacques Landry's terminal illness was not specified in the film, the LGBT magazine The Body Politic reviewed it as an HIV/AIDS allegory, directly comparing and contrasting its views of mortality with the contemporaneous HIV/AIDS-themed documentary film No Sad Songs.

Awards
The film was one of two selected for the Société générale du cinéma du Québec's annual awards, alongside André Melançon's The Dog Who Stopped the War (La Guerre des tuques). The award's prize consisted of a $100,000 investment in the production of the directors' next films.

The film received a Genie Award nomination for Best Original Song, for Michel Rivard's "Le temps nous dépasse".

Cast
 Jean Beaudry as Jacques Landry
 Léa-Marie Cantin as Monique
 Carole Chatel
 Carole Fréchette as Pierrette
 Pat Gagnon as Visiteur à l'hôpital
 Pierre Rousseau as Denis Langlois

See also
 List of submissions to the 58th Academy Awards for Best Foreign Language Film
 List of Canadian submissions for the Academy Award for Best Foreign Language Film

References

External links
 

1984 films
1984 drama films
Canadian drama films
Films directed by François Bouvier
Films about death
Films directed by Jean Beaudry
French-language Canadian films
1980s Canadian films